The Fountain of Life may refer to:

 The Fountain of Life (film), a 2012 fan film based on the Masters of the Universe franchise
 The Fountain of Life (painting), a 1432 painting attributed to Jan van Eyck and others
 The Fountain of Life (sculpture), a 1905 sculpture by Ivan Meštrović

See also 
 Fountain of Life